Alberta Provincial Highway No. 779 is a highway in the province of Alberta, Canada. It runs south-north from Highway 627 (Garden Valley Road) in Parkland County through the Town of Stony Plain to Highway 37 west of Calahoo in Sturgeon County. It runs along the Fifth Meridian for its entire length, which was surveyed as 114° Longitude in the Dominion Land Survey, and used by the Alberta Township System. The highway is also known as Range Road 10 in the two counties and 48 Street within Stony Plain.

Major intersections 
Starting from the south end of Highway 779:

References 

779